Arnold Mooney (born December 8, 1950) is an American politician. A Republican, he has been in the Alabama House of Representatives from the 43rd district since 2014.

In May 2019, Mooney announced that he would seek the Republican nomination for U.S. Senate seat in Alabama in the 2020 election. He received 1 percent of the vote in the March 3, 2020 primary.

References

1950 births
Living people
Republican Party members of the Alabama House of Representatives
21st-century American politicians
Politicians from Montgomery, Alabama
Candidates in the 2020 United States Senate elections